The canton of Melun is a French administrative division, located in the arrondissement of Melun, in the Seine-et-Marne département (Île-de-France région).

Composition
The canton consists of the following communes:
 Livry-sur-Seine
 Maincy
 Melun
 Montereau-sur-le-Jard
 La Rochette
 Rubelles
 Saint-Germain-Laxis
 Vaux-le-Pénil
 Voisenon

See also
 Cantons of the Seine-et-Marne department
 Communes of the Seine-et-Marne department

References

Melun